Caraballo is a Spanish surname. Notable people with the surname include:

Edward Caraballo (born c. 1961), American photojournalist
Erwin Caraballo (born 1981), Venezuelan sport wrestler
Francisco Caraballo (born 1983), Venezuelan baseball player
José Caraballo (1930–1992), Puerto Rican painter
Ramon Caraballo (born 1969), Dominican Republic baseball player
Wilfredo Caraballo (born 1947), Puerto Rican politician

See also
Caraballo Mountains, mountain range of Luzon, Philippines

Spanish-language surnames